Botany is a natural science concerned with the study of plants. The main branches of botany (also referred to as "plant science") are commonly divided into three groups: core topics, concerned with the study of the fundamental natural phenomena and processes of plant life, the classification and description of plant diversity; applied topics which study the ways in which plants may be used for economic benefit in horticulture, agriculture and forestry; and organismic topics which focus on plant groups such as algae, mosses or flowering plants.

Core topics 
 Cytology – cell structure
 Epigenetics – Control of gene expression
 Paleobotany – Study of fossil plants and plant evolution
 Palynology – Pollen and spores
 Plant biochemistry – Chemical processes of primary and secondary metabolism
 Phenology – timing of germination, flowering and fruiting
 Phytochemistry – Plant secondary chemistry and chemical processes
 Phytogeography – Plant Biogeography, the study of plant distributions
 Phytosociology – Plant communities and interactions
 Plant anatomy – Structure of plant cells and tissues 
 Plant ecology – Role and function of plants in the environment
 Plant evolutionary developmental biology – Plant development from an evolutionary perspective
 Plant genetics – Genetic inheritance in plants
 Plant morphology – Structure of plants 
 Plant physiology – Life functions of plants
 Plant reproduction – Processes of plant reproduction
 Plant systematics – Classification and naming of plants
 Plant taxonomy – Classification and naming of plants
Seed Technology -  Study having to do with seed production, maintenance, quality and preservation

Applied topics 
 Agronomy – Application of plant science to crop production
 Arboriculture – Culture and propagation of trees
 Astrobotany - The study of plants in space
 Biotechnology – Use of plants to synthesize products
 Dendrology – Study of woody plants, shrubs, trees and lianas
 Economic botany – Study of plants of economic use or value
 Ethnobotany – Plants and people. Use and selection of plants by humans 
 Forestry – Forest management and related studies
 Horticulture – cultivation of garden plants
 Marine botany – Study of aquatic plants and algae that live in seawater
 Micropropagation – rapid propagation of plants using cell and tissue culture
 Pharming (genetics) – Genetic engineering of plants to produce pharmaceuticals
 Plant breeding – Breeding of plants with desirable genetic characters
 Plant pathology (Phytopathology) – Plant diseases
 Plant propagation – propagation of plants from seed, bulbs, tubers, cuttings and grafting
 Pomology – Fruit and nuts
 Seed technology - Seed technology is the science dealing with the methods of improving physical and genetical characteristics of seed.

Organismal topics 
 Acanthochronology – Cacti
 Agrostology – Grasses
 Batology – Brambles
 Bryology – Mosses, liverworts, and hornworts
 Citrology - Citruses
 Dendrology – Trees
 Lichenology – Lichens
 Mycology, or fungology – Fungi
 Orchidology – Orchids
 Phycology, or algology – Algae
 Pteridology – Ferns and their allies
 Rhodology – Roses
 Synantherology – Compositae

References